Masada Anniversary Edition Vol. 5: Masada Rock is the fifth and final album in a series of five releases celebrating the 10th anniversary of John Zorn's Masada songbook project. It features 10 Masada songs performed by Jon Madof's Rashanim trio with Shanir Ezra Blumenkranz on bass and Mathias Kunzli on drums in addition to Madof's guitar with guest appearances from Marc Ribot on two tracks.  It was released in 2005 on Zorn's Tzadik Records as part of the Radical Jewish Culture Series.

Reception
Allmusic music critic Sean Westergaard wrote "The tunes range stylistically from some sort of ethnic surf music to punk jazz to beautiful acoustic pieces... A wide ranging program to be sure, but very well done." On All About Jazz Kurt Gottschalk observed "Madof is a valuable new gun-for-hire in town and he proves himself here to be both a delicate and a hard-rocking player. If at times his blister is a little over the top (as on "Chorek and "Zemanim ), the mad swerves between head-solo-head and head-headbang-head are not so far removed from Zorn's cut-and-paste projects of the '80s."

Track listing 
 "Bahir" – 4:10 
 "Makom" – 5:21
 "Zidon" – 4:39 
 "Shadrakh" – 4:57
 "Chorek" – 4:58
 "Anakim" – 5:15 
 "Zemanim" – 3:45
 "Ahavah" – 3:26
 "Arad" – 3:02
 "Terumah" – 8:27

All compositions by John Zorn.

Personnel 
 Shanir Ezra Blumenkranz – electric bass, oud 
 Jon Madof – guitar 
 Matthias Künzli – drums, percussion 
 Marc Ribot – guitar on tracks 1 and 4

References 

2005 albums
Tzadik Records albums
Masada Anniversary albums
Albums produced by John Zorn
Jon Madof albums